Carex lasiolepis is a tussock-forming species of perennial sedge in the family Cyperaceae. It is native to parts of Japan, Korea and Primorsky Krai in far eastern Russia.

See also
List of Carex species

References

lasiolepis
Taxa named by Adrien René Franchet
Plants described in 1895
Flora of Korea
Flora of Japan
Flora of Primorsky Krai